Route 250, or Highway 250, may refer to:

Canada
 Manitoba Provincial Road 250
 Prince Edward Island Route 250

Costa Rica
 National Route 250

Japan
 Japan National Route 250

United States
 U.S. Route 250
 Arkansas Highway 250
 California State Route 250
 Georgia State Route 250 (former)
 Hawaii Route 250
 Illinois Route 250
 Indiana State Road 250
 Kentucky Route 250
 Minnesota State Highway 250
 Montana Secondary Highway 250
 Nebraska Highway 250
 New Mexico State Road 250
 New York State Route 250
 Oregon Route 250
 Pennsylvania Route 250 (former)
 Tennessee State Route 250
 Texas State Highway 250 (former)
 Texas State Highway Loop 250
 Farm to Market Road 250 (Texas)
 Utah State Route 250 (former)
Territories:
 Puerto Rico Highway 250